"Vuelvo" is a pop rock and alternative rock song recorded by Beto Cuevas, Chilean singer and ex member of the internationally successful and Grammy-winning band La Ley and the first single from his first solo studio album, Miedo Escenico.

Song information
The first single from him debut solo album was released as radio airplay in Chile on 11 August 2008 and later Mexico, finally was released in radio airplay, digital download and CD single in September 2008. The song was written during 2007 by himself in Los Angeles, California. It was co-produced with Steve Tushar and Aureo Baquerio.

Music video

This music video for the single "Vuelvo" was filmed in Los Angeles, California, United States in August 2008, and was directed by Cuevas. The music videos shows Beto Cuevas walking through streets and playing his guitar and singing, while wearing colored shirts and being followed by a girl. The music video premiered in MTV Latin America on 12 September 2008 and peaked at number 2 in Los 10+ Pedidos Argentina, peaking at number 8 in Los 10+ Pedidos Chile. On 30 September 2008 the music videos were made available on the iTunes Store United States.

Track listing
CD single
 "Vuelvo" (Single Version) – 4:13
 "Vuelvo" (Album Version) – 4:15
 "Vuelvo" (Stop Psycodelic Remix) – 5:37

Digital Download Single 1
 "Vuelvo" (Single Version) – 4:13

Digital Download Single 1
 "Vuelvo" (Single Version) – 4:13
 "Vuelvo" (Stop Psycodelic Remix) – 5:37

Chart performance
"Vuelvo" was the first single off the new album. The single is now #30 in the AmericanBillboard Latin Pop Airplay charts.

Charts

Release history

References

External links
The Official Beto Cuevas Site
[http://www.myspace.com/betocuevas  The Official Beto Cuevas My Space Site
Lyrics of this song - Vuelvo

2008 singles
2008 songs
Warner Records singles